Peter Voško (born 17 August 2000) is a Slovak footballer who plays for Tatran Liptovský Mikuláš as a forward.

Club career

Železiarne Podbrezová
Voško made his professional debut for Železiarne Podbrezová against Spartak Trnava on 3 November 2018. He came on after some hour of play, replacing Endy Bernadina, when Podbrezová trailed one goal behind. Vakhtang Chanturishvili scored the goal in 90th minute, to seal Podbrezová's 0-2 defeat.

Tatran Liptovský Mikuláš
On 8 February 2020, Tatran had announced a half-season loan agreement with Voško. This later extended to a full-time contract.

International career
Veselovský enjoyed his first Slovakia U21 national team recognition on 17 March 2022 under Jaroslav Kentoš ahead of two 2023 Under-21 European Championship qualifiers against Northern Ireland and Spain, when he was listed as an alternate to the 23-player squad.

References

External links
 FK Železiarne Podbrezová official club profile 
 
 Futbalnet profile 
 

2000 births
Living people
People from Levoča District
Sportspeople from the Prešov Region
Slovak footballers
Association football forwards
FK Železiarne Podbrezová players
FK Pohronie players
Partizán Bardejov players
MFK Tatran Liptovský Mikuláš players
Slovak Super Liga players
2. Liga (Slovakia) players